Little Elk Farm, also known as Little Venture, is a historic home located at Providence, Cecil County, Maryland, United States. It is a late-18th-century -story, stone main section, with a smaller -story stone wing. A late-19th-century kitchen addition is attached to wing.

The Little Elk Farm was listed on the National Register of Historic Places in 1979.

References

External links
, including photo from 1979, Maryland Historical Trust

Houses on the National Register of Historic Places in Maryland
Houses in Cecil County, Maryland
National Register of Historic Places in Cecil County, Maryland